Concerned Republicans, formed in December 2006, is an umbrella political groups which plans to run independent republican candidates in the 2007 Northern Ireland Assembly election on a manifesto of non-endorsement of the Police Service of Northern Ireland and would be anti-Good Friday Agreement and anti-St Andrews Agreement.

Possible candidates
A number of figures have indicated their willingness to run as independent republican candidates in the forthcoming election, including:
 Peggy O'Hara (76), mother of Irish National Liberation Army (INLA) hunger striker Patsy O'Hara
 Paul McGlinchey, brother of murdered INLA leader Dominic McGlinchey
 Gerry McGeough, former Provisional Irish Republican Army volunteer, gunrunner and Sinn Féin Ard Comhairle member, from County Tyrone.

References  	 

Concerned Republicans